Clusiella elegans is a plant species in the genus Clusiella. When Planchon and Triana first published the genus in 1860, based on C. elegans, the genus was considered monotypic and remained as such for about 100 years. Isotype by Planchon and Triana is kept at University of Montpellier and is from Nueva Granada in northern Colombia (forests 2000 metres).

References

External links

Calophyllaceae
Plants described in 1860
Flora of Colombia
Taxa named by Jules Émile Planchon
Taxa named by José Jerónimo Triana